John Yaccino (June 27, 1940 – March 20, 2019) was an American football defensive back. He played for the Buffalo Bills in 1962.

He died on March 20, 2019, in Ponte Vedra Beach, Florida at age 78.

References

1940 births
2019 deaths
American football defensive backs
Pittsburgh Panthers football players
Buffalo Bills players